Lalruatthara  (born 7 January 1995) is an Indian professional footballer who plays as a defender for Indian Super League club  Odisha.

Club career

Early career
Born in Mizoram, Lalruatthara attended trials for the Chandigarh Football Academy in 2009 and managed to make it. He was soon though rejected from the academy for unknown reasons, with even Lalruatthara being confused over his exclusion. He soon joined the youth team of Luangmual before signing a senior contract with Chanmari of the Mizoram Premier League. He was part of the Chanmari side that won the 2013–14 edition of the Premier League and then the Mizoram team that won the 2014 Santosh Trophy.

Aizawl
Lalruatthara signed for newly promoted I-League side, Aizawl, from Chanmari before the 2015–16 season. He made his professional debut for the side on 9 January 2016 against Mohun Bagan. He played the full match and earned a yellow card as Aizawl lost 3–1.

He scored his first goal for the club on 17 January 2017 against Shillong Lajong. His 32nd-minute goal was the first in a 2–1 victory. He was soon part of the Aizawl side that won the 2016–17 I-League.

Delhi Dynamos (loan)
On 18 September 2016 it was announced that Lalruatthara had signed with Indian Super League side Delhi Dynamos on loan.

Kerala Blasters
On 23 July 2017, Lalruatthara was selected in the fourth round of the 2017–18 ISL Players Draft by the Kerala Blasters for the 2017–18 Indian Super League season. He made his debut for the club on 17 November 2017 against ATK. He started the match and helped the Kerala Blasters to keep a 0–0 draw. Lalurathara won the Indian Super League Emerging Player of the League award in 2017–18 Indian Super League season. After the season he extended the contract with the Blasters till 2021. During the 2018-19 Indian Super League season he made a total of 12 appearances for the Blasters. In the following season, he was suffered by an injury. He was only able to make 3 appearances for the Blasters in total during the season.

Odisha 
On 8 June 2021, it was announced that Lalruatthara had signed with Indian Super League side Odisha on a two years deal.

International
He made his debut for  India on 27 March 2018 against   Kyrgyzstan in 2019 AFC Asian Cup Qualifiers. In July 2017, he was selected in final India U23 squad which travelled to Qatar to play 2018 AFC U-23 Championship qualification.

Career statistics

Honours

India
 Intercontinental Cup: 2018

Aizawl FC
 I-League: 2016–17

Individual
Indian Super League Emerging Player Of The Season: 2017–18:

References

External links 
 Indian Super League Profile

1995 births
Living people
Footballers from Mizoram
Indian footballers
Luangmual F.C. players
Chanmari FC players
Aizawl FC players
Odisha FC players
Lalruatthara
Association football defenders
Mizoram Premier League players
I-League players
Indian Super League players
India youth international footballers